

Æthelbald was a medieval Bishop of Sherborne.

Æthelbald was consecrated either around 909 or between 918 and 925. He died either around 909 or between 918 and 925.

Notes

Citations

References

External links
 

Bishops of Sherborne (ancient)
10th-century deaths
10th-century English bishops
Year of birth unknown